KSBP may refer to:

 KSBP-LP, a defunct low-power radio station (101.1 FM) formerly licensed to serve Parachute, Colorado, United States
 the ICAO code for San Luis Obispo County Regional Airport